Piotr Grigoryevich Borodin (– 1986) was a Soviet politician who served as First Secretary of the Regional Committee of Moldova of the Communist Party of the MSSR (1939–1942).

Biography 
Piotr Grigoryevich Borodin  was born on June 6, 1905.

Piotr Borodin graduated from the Dnipropetrovsk Building Institute in 1930 and became a construction engineer. He completed his post-graduate studies in 1936, at the Dnipropetrovsk Building Institute.

In 1926, he became a member of the Russian Communist Party (Bolshevik). In the 1930s, he was a high-ranking official in the Moldavian ASSR in Tiraspol; he was the second Secretary of the Communist Party in Moldavian ASSR (February – June 1939) and the First Secretary of the Communist Party in Moldavian ASSR (June 1939 – 14 August 1940).

Piotr Borodin was the First Secretary of the Moldavian Communist Party (August 14, 1940 – February 11, 1942). He was simultaneously a member of the CC of the Communist Party of Ukraine (17 May 1940 – 25 January 1949), a member of the central revisioning Commission of the Communist Party of the USSR and a member of the military Council of the Southern front of the Red Army. Between February 20, 1941 – October 5, 1952 he was a member of the Central Revision Commission of the CPSU. He died in 1986.

References

External links
 Бородин Пётр Григорьевич
 *** - Enciclopedia sovietică moldovenească (Chişinău, 1970–1977)

First Secretaries of the Communist Party of Moldavia
1905 births
1986 deaths
Soviet politicians
Politicians from Dnipro
People from Yekaterinoslav Governorate
Ukrainian communists
Central Committee of the Communist Party of Ukraine (Soviet Union) members
Politicians of the Moldavian Autonomous Soviet Socialist Republic
First convocation members of the Supreme Soviet of the Soviet Union